Faludy is a Hungarian surname.  People with the surname include:

 Alexander Faludy (born 1983), English former child prodigy
 György Faludy (1910–2006), Hungarian-born poet, writer and translator

See also
 Susan Faludi (born 1959), American journalist and author

Hungarian-language surnames